Rubén Bover Izquierdo (born 24 June 1992) is a Spanish footballer who plays for FC Andorra. He plays primarily as a winger, but can also play as an attacking midfielder or a striker.

Club career

Early career
Born in Majorca, Bover began his career at the academy of Mallorca. When he was 17, he moved to England and signed for Conference National side Kidderminster Harriers.

Halesowen Town
Following his release by cash strapped Kidderminster, he joined Halesowen Town during the summer of 2010. He impressed during pre-season friendlies often playing back up to winger Daryl Taylor. Following Taylor's departure, however, Bover became first choice winger. He scored 2 goals in 20 appearances for the side, before being offered a trial at then manager, Tony Thorpe's former club Queens Park Rangers. However, the trial was unsuccessful but Bover opted to look for a Football League club opposed to returning to Halesowen Town.

Charlton Athletic
In July 2011, League One club Charlton Athletic signed Bover after impressing during trials and friendlies played towards the end of the 2010–11 season. Bover made his first competitive start for the club in a 2–1 win over Reading in the League Cup where he hit the post in the last few minutes of the game.

He joined Spanish side CD San Roque de Lepe for the remainder of the 2011–12 season, where he scored 1 goal in 10 Segunda División B appearances. Bover scored for San Roque de Lepe on 13 May 2012 in a 3–2 victory over Lorca Atlético. On 3 July 2012, Bover signed a one-year contract extension with Charlton.

New York Red Bulls
In January 2013, Bover began a trial with Major League Soccer side New York Red Bulls and eventually signed for the club on 8 February 2013. On 3 March 2013 Bover made his official debut for New York starting for his new club in a 3–3 draw at Portland Timbers. On 11 October 2014 Bover scored his first MLS goal in a 3-1 victory over Toronto FC. The New York Red Bulls waived Ruben Bover on March 12, 2015, after 22 appearances for the club.

New York Cosmos
On April 15, 2015, Bover signed for New York Cosmos B. Bover was named NPSL MVP and captured the National Premier Soccer League NPSL regular season title with Cosmos B.

The Spaniard made his first appearance for the Cosmos' first team on June 13, 2015, in a 3-3 draw vs. Jacksonville Armada FC. On August 4, 2015, the club announced he had joined the first team permanently.

Bover made 12 appearances and five starts, registering 544 minutes on the field during the 2015 NASL season. He scored his first goal with the top squad on Oct. 11, 2015 against FC Edmonton in a 3-0 New York win at Shuart Stadium. He helped the New York Cosmos win the NASL Championship in 2015.

That season Bover had the opportunity to play alongside Spanish legends Raúl and Marcos Senna at the Cosmos. As a Real Madrid fan, Bover described playing with Raúl as "a dream come true".

Barnet
On January 27, 2017, Bover joined League Two club Barnet. He made his English Football League debut against Mansfield Town on 4 February 2017. He scored his first goal for Barnet in an EFL Trophy tie against AFC Wimbledon on 29 August 2017. He was released by Barnet at the end of the 2017–18 season.

FC Andorra
Bover joined FC Andorra on 8 December 2018. He scored on his debut the following day.

References

External links
New York Cosmos profile

1992 births
Living people
Footballers from Mallorca
Spanish footballers
Spanish expatriate footballers
Association football wingers
RCD Mallorca players
Kidderminster Harriers F.C. players
Halesowen Town F.C. players
Charlton Athletic F.C. players
CD San Roque de Lepe footballers
New York Red Bulls players
New York Cosmos B players
New York Cosmos (2010) players
Barnet F.C. players
FC Andorra players
Expatriate footballers in England
Expatriate soccer players in the United States
Expatriate footballers in Andorra
Spanish expatriate sportspeople in England
Spanish expatriate sportspeople in the United States
Spanish expatriate sportspeople in Andorra
Southern Football League players
Primera Federación players
Segunda División B players
Primera Catalana players
Major League Soccer players
North American Soccer League players
National Premier Soccer League players
English Football League players